Ophiogomphus australis, the southern snaketail, is a dragonfly in the genus Ophiogomphus ("snaketails"), in the family Gomphidae ("clubtails"). 
Ophiogomphus australis is found in North America.

The IUCN conservation status of Ophiogomphus australis is "NT", Near Threatened. The population is decreasing.

References

Further reading
 American Insects: A Handbook of the Insects of America North of Mexico, Ross H. Arnett. 2000. CRC Press.
 Garrison, Rosser W. / Poole, Robert W., and Patricia Gentili, eds. (1997). Odonata. Nomina Insecta Nearctica: A Check List of the Insects of North America, vol. 4: Non-Holometabolous Orders, 551-580.
 Paulson, Dennis R., and Sidney W. Dunkle (1999). A Checklist of North American Odonata including English name, etymology, type locality, and distribution. Slater Museum of Natural History, University of Puget Sound, Occasional Paper no. 56, 88.

External links
NCBI Taxonomy Browser, Ophiogomphus australis

Ophiogomphus
Insects described in 1992